McGirr is an unincorporated community in DeKalb County, Illinois, United States, located north-northwest of Waterman.

References

Unincorporated communities in DeKalb County, Illinois
Unincorporated communities in Illinois